Rocco Leo Gaglioti is an American television director, writer, producer, host, and businessman. He is best known for creating television series Courtney, Carol Alt's Living Room, and Fashion News Live.

Career
Rocco is the founder of the television network FNL Network.
In 2018, he created the TV show, The Wishwall, starring Simonetta Lein. His documentary, Inside Amato, won Best Documentary at the Bokeh South Africa International Fashion Film Festival in 2017. He created the reality show, Courtney, about Courtney Stodden life story in 2019. He is a member of the Producers Guild of America.

Filmography

References

External links
 

Living people
American television writers
American television directors
American television producers
American male television writers
1977 births